A karahi (Marathi: कढई, ; also kadai, kerahi, karai, kadhi, kadahi, kadhai sarai, or cheena chatti) is a type of thick, circular, and deep cooking pot (similar in shape to a wok) that originated in the Indian subcontinent.  It is used in Indian, Afghan, Pakistani, Bangladeshi, Nepalese and Caribbean cuisines. Traditionally press-formed from mild steel sheet or made of wrought iron, a karahi resembles a wok with steeper sides. Today, they can be made of stainless steel, copper, and nonstick surfaces, both round and flat-bottomed, or of the traditional materials.

History 
Karahi or Kadahi comes from the Prakrit word Kataha, mentioned in Ramayana, Sushruta Samhita. The Karahi vessel is first mentioned in the Vedas as bharjanapatra.

Use 

Karahi serve for the shallow or deep frying of meat, potatoes, sweets, and snacks such as samosa and fish and also for Indian papadams, but are most noted for the simmering of stews or posola, which are often named karahi dishes after the utensil.

Karahi dishes 

Stews prepared in a karahi include chicken, beef, mutton (goat) and lamb. Karahis prepared with paneer or tofu are becoming increasingly popular amongst vegetarians. Prepared in a reduced tomato and green-chilli base with ghee, a karahi is a popular late-night meal in Indian and Pakistani cuisine, usually ordered by the kilogram or half/full karahis and consumed with naan.

An inverted karahi is used to cook rumali rotis.

See also
 List of cooking vessels

References

External links
 

Indian food preparation utensils
Pakistani food preparation utensils
Cooking vessels
Bangladeshi food preparation utensils